Juli Básti (born Júlia Básti; 10 August 1957) is a Hungarian actress. She has appeared in more than 40 films and television shows since 1980. She won the award for Best Actress at the 14th Moscow International Film Festival for her role in The Red Countess.

Selected filmography

References

External links

1957 births
Living people
Hungarian film actresses
20th-century Hungarian actresses
21st-century Hungarian actresses
Actresses from Budapest